Captain María Inés Ortiz (April 24, 1967 – July 10, 2007) was the first American nurse to die in combat during Operation Iraqi Freedom and the first U.S. Army nurse to die in combat since the Vietnam War. The United States Army named the Forward Operating Base Prosperity clinic after her.

Early years
Ortiz's parents, Jorge Ortiz and Iris Santiago, moved from Puerto Rico to Camden, New Jersey, where Ortiz was born. Her parents moved back to the island when she was a child and settled in the city of Bayamón where she received her primary and secondary education. In 1991, Ortiz enlisted in the United States Army Reserve in Puerto Rico. Her first two years of active duty included service in Honduras, South Korea and the Walter Reed Army Hospital in Washington, D.C.

Army nurse
Ortiz became interested in nursing and pursued her objective of becoming a registered nurse by continuing her academic education at the University of Puerto Rico.  She earned her degree in nursing and commissioned as an officer in 1999. In 2004, Ortiz earned her master's degree in quality management from the Massachusetts National Graduate School. Ortiz was assigned to Kirk U.S. Army Health Clinic at the Aberdeen Proving Ground in Maryland, where she was chief nurse of general medicine.

In September 2006, she was reassigned to the 28th Combat Support Hospital, 3rd Medical Command in an area known as the "Green Zone" in Baghdad, Iraq. The Green Zone is a fortified district that also hosts the U.S. Embassy and Iraq's Parliament. That area had been the target of a series of recent attacks which had added to safety concerns for key Iraqi and international officials who live and work there.

On July 10, 2007, the Green Zone area came under a heavy mortar attack. Ortiz, who was not wearing body armor at the time of the attack and was returning to the hospital after a gym workout, was mortally wounded. She was the only U.S. citizen among three people killed.  According to Margaret Tippy, a spokeswoman for the United States Army Medical Command, as of July 13, 2007, 90 Army medical personnel had been killed in combat in Iraq and Afghanistan since 2001. Ortiz is the first Army nurse to perish.

In memory

Captain Ortiz is survived by her parents, four sisters and fiancé in New Jersey and Florida. A memorial service was held on Wednesday, July 18 at the Aberdeen Proving Ground chapel. She was buried at Arlington National Cemetery, in Arlington, Virginia. Her name was inscribed and unveiled by Puerto Rico Senate President Kenneth McClintock in "El Monumento de la Recordación", dedicated to Puerto Rico's fallen soldiers and which is located in San Juan, Puerto Rico on May 26, 2008 during the Memorial Day commemoration attended by President Bill Clinton, Senator Hillary Clinton and military historian Antonio Santiago. Nurse killed in Iraq remembered] Retrieved July 19, 2007  </ref> A plaque was placed at the entrance of the Forward Operating Base Prosperity clinic which was named after her, thus honoring the memory of Capt. Maria Ortiz.

Awards and recognitions
Among Captain María Inés Ortiz's decorations and medals were the following:
   Bronze Star
   Purple Heart
   National Defense Service Medal
   Iraq Campaign Medal
   Global War on Terrorism Service Medal
   Army Service Ribbon
Badges
   Combat Medical Badge

See also

 List of Puerto Ricans
 List of Puerto Rican military personnel
 History of women in Puerto Rico

References

External links

 

1967 births
2007 deaths
American military personnel killed in the Iraq War
American people of Puerto Rican descent
Burials at Arlington National Cemetery
Female wartime nurses
Puerto Rican Army personnel
Puerto Rican military officers
Puerto Rican women in the military
United States Army officers
United States Army Nurse Corps officers
University of Puerto Rico alumni
Women in the Iraq War
Female United States Army officers
United States Army personnel of the Iraq War